Kobellite is a gray, fibrous, metallic mineral with the chemical formula . It is also a sulfide mineral consisting of antimony, bismuth, and lead. It is a member of the izoklakeite - berryite series with silver and iron substituting in the copper site and a varying ratio of bismuth, antimony, and lead. It crystallizes with monoclinic pyramidal crystals. The mineral can be found in ores and deposits of Hvena, Sweden; Ouray, Colorado; and Wake County, North Carolina, US. The mineral was named after Wolfgang Franz von Kobell (1803–1882), a German mineralogist.

See also
List of minerals
List of minerals named after people

References

Lead minerals
Copper(I) minerals
Bismuth minerals
Antimony minerals
Sulfosalt minerals
Orthorhombic minerals
Minerals in space group 58